Thomas Joseph Tehan (18 January 1916 – 1 June 1996) was an Australian politician. Born in Kyabram, Victoria, he was educated at the University of Melbourne before becoming a barrister and solicitor. In 1975 he served as leader of the Victorian branch of the National Country Party. Later that year, he was elected to the Australian Senate as an NCP Senator for Victoria. He was defeated in 1977, when he was third on the Liberal-NCP ticket due to the inclusion of former House of Representatives MP David Hamer.

Tehan died in 1996, aged 80.

References

National Party of Australia members of the Parliament of Australia
Members of the Australian Senate for Victoria
Members of the Australian Senate
1916 births
1996 deaths
20th-century Australian politicians